The Territorial Prelature of Aiquile  is a territorial prelature located in the city of Aiquile in the Ecclesiastical province of Cochabamba in Bolivia.

History
 December 11, 1961: Established as Territorial Prelature of Aiquile from the Diocese of Cochabamba

Leadership
 Prelates of Aiquile (Roman rite), listed in reverse chronological order
 Bishop Jorge Herbas Balderrama, O.F.M. (2009.03.25 Mar - ...)
 Bishop Adalberto Arturo Rosat, O.F.M. (1986.11.22 – 2009.03.25)
 Bishop Jacinto Eccher, O.F.M. (1961.12.16 – 1986.11.22)
 Coadjutor prelate
 Jorge Herbas Balderrama, O.F.M. (2006-2009)

See also
Roman Catholicism in Bolivia

References

External links
 GCatholic.org

Roman Catholic dioceses in Bolivia
Christian organizations established in 1961
Roman Catholic dioceses and prelatures established in the 20th century
Aiquile, Territorial Prelature of
Territorial prelatures
1961 establishments in Bolivia